Oscar Andres Perea Abonce (born 27 September 2005) is a Colombian footballer currently playing as a forward for Atlético Nacional.

Club career
Born in Pereira, Colombia, Perea's father was killed in a workplace accident when he was five months old. He moved with his mother to Santa Cecilia, where he first started playing football at the Escuela Benkos Biojo. At the advice of his uncle, he entered the Envigado Palmira Football School in Palmira, but this was short lived, and he soon returned to his hometown of Pereira.

In 2018 he joined Club La Cantera, where he stayed for two years before a successful trial at Atlético Nacional. He made his debut for Atlético Nacional in the 2022 campaign, before being named by English newspaper The Guardian as one of the best players born in 2005 worldwide later in the same year.

Career statistics

Club

References

2005 births
Living people
People from Pereira, Colombia
People from Risaralda Department
Colombian footballers
Association football forwards
Categoría Primera A players
Atlético Nacional footballers